Historically, the name Azerbaijan was used to refer to the region located south of the Aras River- today known as Iranian Azerbaijan, located in northwestern Iran. The region in the north of the Aras River, which is today called the Republic of Azerbaijan, had not been included within the geographical boundaries of Azerbaijan until 1918. Historians and geographers usually referred to the region north of the Aras River as Aran.
On May 28, 1918, following the collapse of the Russian Empire, a group of political activists in Aran decided to change the name of their region to Azerbaijan by calling it the Azerbaijan Democratic Republic. Historians and scholars have argued that the Pan-Turkic agenda drove the name change.

Pre-Islamic evidence
The name of the region north of the Aras River knows as the Republic of Azerbaijan was called Caucasian Albania by ancient Greek geographers and historians. For example, Strabo (64 or 63 BC – c. AD 24), a Greek geographer, identifies Albania as a separate territory from Atropatene (the ancient name of Azerbaijan) and describes it as “a land extending from the Caspian Sea to the Alazani River and the land of Mede Atropatene to the south.”

Movses Kaghankatvatsi, the author of the book the History of the Country of Albania, which covers the period between 4th century AD and 10th century AD, describes the boundaries of Albania as one that does not go beyond the Aras River.

Islamic period
In addition to Greek works, there are numerous Muslim geographers and historians that have provided information on the geographical boundaries of Aran and Azerbaijan. For instance, Ibn Hawqal, a 10th-century Muslim geographer, draws a map of Azerbaijan and Aran with the Aras River as the natural boundary between these two regions. Estakhri, Another Muslim geographer from the 10th century identifies Aran and Azerbaijan as two separate regions. In his book, the Mu'jam ul-Buldān (Dictionary of Countries), Yaqut al-Hamawi, a Muslim biographer and geographer of the 14th century, clearly separates the geographical boundaries of Aran and Azerbaijan:
“Aran, an Iranian name, is a vast territory with many cities, one of which is Janzeh. This is the same town that people refer to as Ganja and also, Bardha’a, Shamkor, and Bilaqan. Separating Azerbaijan and Aran is a river called Aras. Everything north and west of this river is Aran and everything else located in the south is Azerbaijan.”
Abu al-Fida, a historian of the 14th century, specifies that Azerbaijan and Aran are two different regions. In his book, Borhan-e Qati, Borhan Khalaf-e Tabrizi, an author of the 17th century, writes that “Aras is the name of a famous river” that “separates Aran from Azerbaijan.”Name change in 1918
Following the Russo-Iranian wars of the 19th century, and the consequent Treaty of Turkmenchay in 1828, the Aras River was set to be the boundary between Iran and Russia. As a result, the entire Caucasus was incorporated into the Russian Empire. Given the military weakness of Iran, the Turkish-speaking Muslims of the Caucasus, who were unhappy with Russia and had no hope of protection from Iran, turned to the Ottoman Empire.
The Ottoman Empire who claimed to be the champion of the Muslim world increased its support for Muslims in the Caucasus. At the same time, in the late 19th century, ideas on Islamic unity and Turkish unity had gained popularity among Ottoman intellectuals. It resulted in the establishment of the Committee of Union and Progress in 1889 which called for the preservation of all peoples under the Ottoman Empire around the three pillars of Islam, Turkishness, and Caliphate.

In 1911, a group of Muslim Turkish-speaker intellectuals founded the Muslim Democratic Musavat Party, a small and secret underground organization to work for political unity among Muslims and Turkish-speaking peoples. Influenced by the Young Turks ideas, the leaders of Organizations were sympathetic to Pan-Turkism.
On June 17, 1917, Musavat merged with the Party of Turkic Federalists, another national-democratic right-wing organization, and adopted a new name, Musavat Party of Turkic Federalists. At this time, the main goal of Musavat leaders was to create a united Muslim state under the protection of the Ottoman Empire. After the October Revolution in 1917, when Musavat leaders failed to reach an agreement with Caucasian Bolsheviks, they decided to establish their own government and declare independence. Thus, on May 28, 1918, Musavat leaders declared independence under the name of the Azerbaijan People’s Republic.

Some scholars argue that the reason behind choosing the name Azerbaijan over Aran was because of the demands of the Turks (Ottomans who had a profound influence on Musavat leaders). Naming Aran as Azerbaijan could provide sufficient justification for the political unity of Turkish-speaking people of South Caucasus and northwest Iran under the name of Azerbaijan. It could facilitate the process of Azerbaijan annexation to the Ottoman Empire (later Turkey).

Reactions in Iran
Naming Aran as Azerbaijan caused surprise, confusion, and rage in Iran, especially, among Iranian Azeri intellectuals. Mohammad Khiabani, an Iranian Azeri political activist and some other Iranian Azeri intellectuals recommended changing the name of Iranian Azerbaijan to Azadistan (the Land of freedom) to protest the name change.  Ahmad Kasravi, an Iranian Azeri historian, also got surprised when he heard about the name change, although it seems that he was unaware of the motives behind choosing the name Azerbaijan. In his book, Forgotten Rulers, he wrote:“It is astonishing that Aran is named Azerbaijan now. Azerbaijan or Azerbaigan has always been the name of the territory that is bigger and more famous than its neighbor, Aran, and the two territories have always been distinct from each other. To this day, we have not been able to understand that why our brethren in Aran who strived for a free rule for their country would want to put aside the ancient and historical name of their country and transgresses towards Azerbaijan [‘s name]?”The decision to use the name "Azerbaijan" drew protests from Iran. According to Hamid Ahmadi:

According to Tadeusz Swietochowski:

Southern Azerbaijan

Southern Azerbaijan is a Soviet-invented word, originally used to lay the Soviet Union's territorial claim on the Iranian historical region of Azerbaijan in line with a propaganda campaign to construct a national narrative. Though documents reveal that Moscow was behind instructing such propaganda work, there is also evidence of Soviet internal dissent to this policy, as Sergey Kavtaradze warned Vyacheslav Molotov that "renaming of Iranian Azerbaijan into Southern Azerbaijan... would be inexpedient and fraught with the risk of unwanted consequences". The Soviets continued to promote this word even after demise of Ja'far Pishevari and the puppet state Azerbaijan People's Government.

After the dissolution of the Soviet Union, the "southern" theme was revived again. Utilization of the term has been an integral part of a nation-building attempt by the present-day Republic of Azerbaijan and its government. Official history thought at schools and universities tends to rediscover the separation of the nation when Russo-Persian Wars took place in the early 19th century, and a revisionist interpretation of events to show "constant struggle of the Azerbaijanis for their unity". As a result, usage of the term Iranian Azerbaijan would automatically adjust Republic of Azerbaijan to Iran and undermine justification for independence of the former, and is thus. Certain political circles in Baku welcome the so-called Southern Azerbaijan National Awakening Movement.

Statements by historian George Bournoutian
According to the historian George Bournoutian in his The 1820 Russian Survey of the Khanate of Shirvan: A Primary Source on the Demography and Economy of an Iranian Province prior to its Annexation by Russia.'' (2016, Gibb Memorial Trust.);

p. xvi

p. xvii;

p. xv;

p. xviii;

See also
 The Land of Fire
 Caucasian Albania
 Pan-Turkism
 Turanism

References

Further reading
 
 

History of Azerbaijan
Caucasian Albania
Azerbaijan (Iran)
Place names
Persian words and phrases